Nelson Hudson House, also known as the Hudson-Law-Dargan-Wilson House and Neille Wilson Residence, is a historic home located at Darlington, Darlington County, South Carolina.  It was built about 1830 and is a -story, story frame, weatherboarded Greek Revival style house. It features a front pedimented portico. It has a two-story rear wing that was added around 1854. In the back yard is the original clapboard kitchen. According to local tradition Nelson Hudson was a carriage maker who came to Darlington from Marion District and built the house in 1830.  Since its listing, the house has moved from original location to unknown site.

It was listed on the National Register of Historic Places in 1988.

References

Houses on the National Register of Historic Places in South Carolina
Greek Revival houses in South Carolina
Houses completed in 1830
Houses in Darlington County, South Carolina
National Register of Historic Places in Darlington County, South Carolina
Darlington, South Carolina
1830 establishments in South Carolina